Eşmekaya is a town (belde) and municipality in the Eskil District, Aksaray Province, Turkey. Its population is 2,643 (2021).

References

Populated places in Aksaray Province
Towns in Turkey
Eskil District